KJIK (100.7 FM, "Majik 100.7") is a radio station licensed to serve Duncan/Safford and Eastern Arizona, United States. The station is owned by WSK Family Credit Shelter Trust UTA. It airs a variety music format.

The station was assigned the KJIK call letters by the Federal Communications Commission on February 6, 2003.

References

External links
 KJIK official website

JIK
Greenlee County, Arizona
Mass media in Graham County, Arizona